The name Katherine has been used for two tropical cyclones in the Eastern Pacific Ocean:

 Tropical Storm Jennifer-Katherine (1963)
 Hurricane Katherine (1973)

Pacific hurricane set index articles